Flight lieutenant is a junior commissioned rank in air forces that use the Royal Air Force (RAF) system of ranks, especially in Commonwealth countries. It has a NATO rank code of OF-2. Flight lieutenant is abbreviated as Flt Lt in the Indian Air Force (IAF) and RAF, and as FLTLT in the Pakistan Air Force (PAF), Royal Australian Air Force (RAAF) and Royal New Zealand Air Force (RNZAF) and has sometimes also been abbreviated as F/L in many services; it has never been correctly abbreviated as "lieutenant".  A flight lieutenant ranks above flying officer and below a squadron leader and is sometimes used as an English language translation of a similar rank in non-English-speaking countries.

The rank originated in the Royal Naval Air Service (RNAS) in 1914. It fell into abeyance when the RNAS merged with the Royal Flying Corps during the First World War but was revived in 1919 in the post-war RAF.

An RAF flight lieutenant is the equivalent of a lieutenant in the Royal Navy and a captain in the British Army and Royal Marines. The equivalent rank in the former Women's Auxiliary Air Force (WAAF), Women's Royal Air Force (WRAF) and Princess Mary's Royal Air Force Nursing Service (PMRAFNS) (until 1980) was flight officer.

Origins

The rank originated in the Royal Navy as a rank title for naval lieutenants serving in the Royal Naval Air Service (RNAS). Promotions to the rank were first gazetted on 30 June 1914.  It fell into abeyance when the RNAS merged with the Royal Flying Corps during the First World War but was revived in 1919 in the post-war RAF.

On 1 April 1918, the newly created RAF adopted its officer rank titles from the British Army, with Royal Naval Air Service lieutenants (titled as flight lieutenants and flight commanders) and Royal Flying Corps captains becoming captains in the RAF. In response to the proposal that the RAF should use its own rank titles, it was suggested that the RAF might use the Royal Navy's officer ranks, with the word "air" inserted before the naval rank title. For example, the current rank of flight lieutenant would have been "air lieutenant". Although the Admiralty objected to this simple modification of their rank titles, it was agreed that the RAF might base many of its officer rank titles on navy officer ranks with differing pre-modifying terms. It was also suggested that RAF captains might be entitled flight-leaders. However, the rank title flight lieutenant was chosen as flights were typically commanded by RAF captains and the term flight lieutenant had been used in the Royal Naval Air Service. The RAF rank of flight lieutenant was introduced in August 1919 and it has been used continuously since then.

Usage in the RAF
Royal Air Force

Although in the early years of the RAF a flight lieutenant commanded an aircraft flight, with the increasing combat power of aircraft and therefore squadrons, command and control has shifted up the rank structure (currently, for instance, most squadron commanders in the RAF are Wing Commanders, a reflection on the comparative combat power between the modern air force and its predecessor).

The RAF's promotion system is automatic up until flight lieutenant. Every officer will attain the rank provided they complete their professional training and do not leave early. For aircrew, flight lieutenant is reached 2.5 years after commissioning, Engineering Branch (AS & CE) entrants with applicable bachelor's/master's degrees reach flight lieutenant at 2.5 and 1.5 years respectively, and for all other ground branch officers, 3.5 years. Aircrew are appointed to an Early Departure Payment Commission upon reaching their Operational Conversion Unit, which is a commission for 20 years or age 40, whichever is later. Promotion to squadron leader thereafter is strictly upon merit; officers promoted beyond flight lieutenant are appointed to a career commission, or service to age 60. Resigning a commission is generally dependent on the needs of the service, although an officer who has completed their return of service (service the RAF requires to justify its expense in originally training the officer) could leave after as little as four years. For aircrew, given the large expense required for training, this return of service is generally the length of their initial commission anyway, unless they re-role to a different branch having failed an element of flying training. Most aircrew reach their squadrons as flight lieutenants due to the length of training time required (up to four years for fast jet pilots) and the significant holds in the training pipeline. The majority of squadron line pilots are flight lieutenants, with some squadron executives or Career Commission aircrew reaching Squadron Leader.

Aside from aircrew, whose work typically does not require active leadership for units of airmen, ground branch officers can expect to operate units that can range in size from a few specialist non-commissioned personnel to 50 or more personnel for engineering or other manpower intensive roles. The role of a flight lieutenant generally involves management of a team of specialist non-commissioned officers and airmen, within their specific branch. In the RAF Regiment, a flight lieutenant generally has the same role and responsibility as a captain in the British Army, in charge of a regiment flight of 30 men, and could be second-in-command of a squadron of up to 120 men.

Flight lieutenant is the most common officer rank in the RAF; in April 2013, for example, there were 8,230 RAF officers, of whom 3,890 (47.3%) were flight lieutenants. In RAF informal usage, a flight lieutenant is sometimes referred to as a "flight lieuy". A Flight Lieutenant's starting salary is £42,008.48 as of 2019.

RAF Air Cadets

In the Air Training Corps, a flight lieutenant is usually the officer commanding of a squadron, appointed under a Cadet Forces Commission. Retired flight lieutenants are the first rank that may continue to use their rank after they have left active service.

Insignia
The rank insignia consists of two narrow blue bands on slightly wider black bands. This is worn on both the lower sleeves of the tunic or on the shoulders of the flight suit or the casual uniform. The rank insignia on the mess uniform is similar to the naval pattern, being two band of gold running around each cuff but without the Royal Navy's loop. Unlike senior RAF officers, flight lieutenants are not entitled to fly a command flag under any circumstances.

Other air forces
The rank of flight lieutenant is also used in a number of the air forces in the Commonwealth, including the Bangladesh Air Force, Ghana Air Force, Indian Air Force, Namibian Air Force, Pakistan Air Force, Royal Australian Air Force and Royal New Zealand Air Force. It is also used in the Egyptian Air Force, Hellenic Air Force, Royal Air Force of Oman, Royal Thai Air Force and the Air Force of Zimbabwe.

Canada is a unique exception. Due to the unification of the Canadian Armed Forces in 1968, the air force rank titles are the same as those of the Canadian Army. Like their Commonwealth counterparts, striped rank braids increase from OF-1 to OF-5 in half strip increments. Unique to Canada is the 'pearl grey' (silver) colour for the narrow bands as opposed to the traditional light blue; this was chosen to match the colour of enlisted members' insignia in order to better reflect the RCAF's modern philosophy of 'One team, One mission'. The decision was taken not to restore the historic rank titles for the RCAF due to it being deemed 'too confusing'.

Until the late 1970s, the Royal Malaysian Air Force used the rank. Thereafter the rank of captain was used instead.

Gallery

Notable flight lieutenants

 Alexander, Prince of Yugoslaviamember of Yugoslavian royal family
 Gerald Boueyformer governor of the Bank of Canada
 Sir Arthur C. ClarkeBritish author and inventor
 Sir Christopher LeeBritish actor, served in RAF Intelligence during World War II
 Peter Francis Middletongrandfather of Catherine, Duchess of Cambridge and co-pilot of Prince Philip
 Sir Patrick MooreBritish astronomer
 Donald PleasenceBritish actor
 Matiur Rahman Bangladesh Air Force (Former Pakistan Air Force) pilot; honoured in Bangladesh with highest military honour for his heroic attempt to defect at the start of the Bangladesh Liberation War in 1971.
 Jerry RawlingsGhanaian politician who twice served as his country's president
 Ian SmithPrime Minister of Rhodesia (1964–1979)
 Rory UnderwoodLeicester, England and British and Irish Lions winger
 Jim VipondCanadian sports columnist
 Gough WhitlamPrime Minister of Australia (1972–1975)
John Nichol – Former RAF Navigator, Gulf War prisoner of war and motivational speaker.

See also

 Air force officer rank insignia
 British and U.S. military ranks compared
 Comparative military ranks
 RAF officer ranks
 Ranks of the RAAF
 Lieutenant (for pronunciation)

References

Military ranks of the Commonwealth
Military ranks of Australia
Former military ranks of Canada
Military ranks of the Royal Air Force
Air force ranks
Pakistan Air Force ranks
Military ranks of Bangladesh
Military ranks of Sri Lanka
Military ranks of the Indian Air Force